Kang the Conqueror is a comic book miniseries that was published by Marvel Comics from August to December 2021.

Synopsis 
The series follows Kang's origin.

Prints

Issues

Collected editions

Reception 
Hannibal Tabu from Bleeding Cool gave the first issue 7.5 score and praised the artists. Sayantan Gayen from Comic Book Resources, reviewing the final, wrote "Kang the Conqueror #5 ends on a somber note".

References 

2021 comics debuts
2021 comics endings
Marvel Comics limited series